Boudjounkoura (also Boudjoukoura, Boudjou Nkoura, Bounjoukoura) is a village in the commune of Banyo in the Adamawa Region of Cameroon, near the .

Population 
In 1967, Boudjounkoura contained 377 inhabitants, mostly Fula people

In the 2005 census, 536 people were counted there.

References

Bibliography
 Jean Boutrais, 1993, Peuples et cultures de l'Adamaoua (Cameroun) : actes du colloque de Ngaoundéré du 14 au 16 janvier 1992, Paris : Éd. de l'ORSTOM u.a.
 Dictionnaire des villages de l'Adamaoua, ONAREST, Yaoundé, October 1974, 133 p.

External links
 Banyo, on the website Communes et villes unies du Cameroun (CVUC)

Populated places in Adamawa Region